RNA-binding protein MEX3B is a protein that in humans is encoded by the MEX3B gene.

References

Further reading